Black Head is a locality in the Mid North Coast region of New South Wales, Australia.

Black Head Beach has won awards, and it is patrolled during the summer. The Black Head Surf Lifesaving Club overlooks the beach.

There are cafés and a supermarket. Away from the beach there are coastal landforms, including the headland of Black Head, and rare tracts of littoral rainforest.

See also
 Littoral Rainforests of New South Wales

References

Beaches of New South Wales
Headlands of New South Wales